These are the late night schedules on all three networks for each calendar season beginning September 1978. All times are Eastern/Pacific.

PBS is not included, as member television stations have local flexibility over most of their schedules and broadcast times for network shows may vary, CBS and ABC are not included on the weekend schedules (as the networks do not offer late night programs of any kind on weekends).

Talk/Variety shows are highlighted in yellow, Local News & Programs are highlighted in white.

Monday-Friday

Saturday

Sunday

By network

ABC

Returning Series
ABC Late Night

CBS

Returning Series
The CBS Late Movie

NBC

Returning Series
The Midnight Special
NBC Late Night Movie
Saturday Night Live
The Tomorrow Show
The Tonight Show Starring Johnny Carson

Not returning from 1977-78
Weekend

United States late night network television schedules
1978 in American television
1979 in American television